The Rutgers Scarlet Knights men's basketball team represents Rutgers University in NCAA Division I college basketball competition and competes in the Big Ten Conference. Rutgers made the NCAA Final Four in 1976. Rutgers has appeared in the NCAA tournament eight times, most recently appearing in 2022. Rutgers has produced many NBA players, most notably Roy Hinson, John Battle, and James Bailey.

History

The Rutgers men's basketball team played in the Final Four in the 1976 NCAA tournament and ended the 1976 season ranked fourth in the nation, after an 70–86 loss against the Michigan Wolverines in the semifinal round and a 92–106 loss to the UCLA Bruins in the tournament's third-place consolation game. This was the last men's Division I tournament to date to feature two unbeaten teams, as both Indiana, who won that year's title, and Rutgers entered the tournament unbeaten. Rutgers went 31–0 during the regular season.

The Scarlet Knights also played in the championship game of the 2004 NIT Final, losing to the Michigan Wolverines 55–62.

The Scarlet Knights had a prolonged down period through the following decade, cycling through a number of coaches and routinely finishing at the bottom of the Big East standings. This period included a scandal in 2013 with then head coach Mike Rice Jr. being shown on video verbally and physically abusing players. The scandal resulted in the firing of Coach Rice as well as the resignation of then Rutgers athletic director Tim Pernetti.

Rutgers basketball played their first season in the Big Ten conference in 2014–2015. Fortunes began to improve following the hiring of Head Coach Steve Pikiell in 2016. The 2019–20 Rutgers Scarlet Knights men's basketball team saw their win total improve from 14 to 20 and included multiple wins over ranked teams, as well as an 18–1 home record, one of the best in the country. Experts widely predicted Rutgers's inclusion in the 2020 NCAA Division I men's basketball tournament which was subsequently cancelled before the field was announced.  Additionally, this season marked the first time since 1979 that Rutgers basketball was ranked in the top 25 teams. The team officially broke the 30-year tournament drought in 2021, when they earned a 10-seed in the 2021 NCAA Division I men's basketball tournament. Another dry spell was ended when they beat Clemson in the first round, their first tournament win since 1983. The Scarlet Knights, led by guards Geo Baker and Ron Harper Jr., bowed out after a close loss to eventual Final Four participants Houston in the second round.  Currently through Steve Pikiell’s 2022–23 season, the teams leaders revolve around senior point guard Paul Mulcahy, junior center Cliff Omoruyi, and last years Big Ten all defensive winner, super senior guard Caleb McConnell.

Postseason

NCAA tournament results
The Scarlet Knights have appeared in the NCAA tournament eight times. Their combined record is 6–9.

NIT results
The Scarlet Knights have appeared in the National Invitation Tournament (NIT) 15 times. Their combined record is 16–15.

Retired numbers
Three Rutgers players have had their numbers retired:

Scarlet Knights in the NBA

23 Rutgers alumni have been selected in the NBA draft.

15 Rutgers alumni have played at least one game in the NBA, including:
 Bob Lloyd, 1968–1969
 Bob Greacen, 1970–1972
 Phil Sellers, 1977
 Eddie Jordan, 1978–1984
 Hollis Copeland, 1980–1982
 James Bailey, 1980–1988
 Roy Hinson, 1984–1991
 John Battle, 1986–1995
 Charles Jones, 1999–2000
 Dahntay Jones, 2004–2017
 Luis Flores, 2005
 Quincy Douby, 2007–2009
 Hamady N'Diaye, 2011–2014
 Eugene Omoruyi, 2022–2023
 Ron Harper Jr., 2023

Players in international competition

 Junior Etou (born 1994), Congolese basketball player for Hapoel Be'er Sheva of the Israeli Basketball Premier League
 Steve Kaplan, American-Israeli basketball player in the Israel Basketball Premier League

References

External links